Guangdong-Hong Kong Cup 1982–83 is the 5th staging of this two-leg competition between Hong Kong and Guangdong.

Guangdong captured the champion by winning an aggregate 5–4 after penalty shootout.

Trivia
 Away goal system is not used yet. It is the first time for the result to be decided by penalty shootout in this competition.

Results
First Leg

Second Leg

References
 HKFA website 省港盃回憶錄(四) (in chinese)

 

1982-83
Guan
1983 in Chinese football